POG or Pog may refer to:

Arts, entertainment, and media
 Pogs, a 1990s children's game, as well as the disk-shaped cardboard game pieces used in that game
 Pillars of Garendall (PoG), a role-playing video game
 PogChamp, an emote and internet meme originating on Twitch
 PogChamps, an online chess tournament
 "Pog", an Alan Moore-written issue of Swamp Thing paying homage to Walt Kelly's comic strip Pogo
 One of the two title characters in Pib and Pog, an animated short film created by Aardman Animations

Businesses and organizations
 Pog (drink) (passion fruit-orange-guava), a tropical juice drink
 Pediatric Oncology Group, a former U.S. and Canadian clinical trial cooperative group
 Pittsburgh Organizing Group, a former Pittsburgh, Pennsylvania, US-based anarchist organization
 Galician Workers' Party (Galician: Partido Obreiro Galego, POG), a political party in Galicia, Spain

Science and technology
 Pan-STARRS Optical Galaxy Survey (theSkyNet POGS), an astronomy research project
 PHP Object Generator, a type of object–relational mapping software
 Polyphonic Octave Generator, a pedal for pitch shift effects in musical instruments

Other uses
 POG FC (Port-Gentil FC), a Gabonese association football team
 The Pogs, an Australian beat music group
 Planogram, visual representations of a store's products or services
 Portage station, Wisconsin, United States, station code POG

See also
 Personnel Other than Grunts or pogues, pejorative US military slang